David Leonard Stoddart, Baron Stoddart of Swindon (4 May 1926 – 14 November 2020) was a British politician who served as Member of Parliament (MP) for Swindon from 1970 to 1983, and as a life peer in the House of Lords from 1983 to his death in 2020. He served as a Labour peer from 1983 to 2002, when he was expelled from the Labour benches, after which he sat as an Independent Labour peer until his death.

Early life
David Leonard Stoddart was born on 4 May 1926 to Arthur and Queenie Stoddart. He was educated at St Clement Danes Holborn Estate Grammar School for Boys and Henley Grammar School.

Political career
Stoddart joined the Labour Party in 1947. He was a member of the County Borough Council of Reading from 1954 to 1972 and the leader of the Council from 1967 to 1972.

Stoddart was the Labour candidate for Newbury in 1959 and 1964, and narrowly lost at Swindon in a by-election in 1969.

Stoddart became the Labour Member of Parliament for Swindon in 1970, but in 1983 he lost his seat to the Conservative Simon Coombs.  Stoddart was a government whip from 1975 to 1978, PPC to the Housing Minister 1974–75 and Front Bench opposition spokesman on Trade and Industry.

House of Lords
Stoddart was raised to the peerage as a life peer on 14 September 1983 taking the title Baron Stoddart of Swindon, of Reading in the Royal County of Berkshire. He was Chief Front Bench spokesman on energy 1983–1988 and served as House of Lords Whip during the same period.

He was expelled from the Labour benches in the House of Lords in 2002 for backing a Socialist Alliance candidate at the 2001 general election, an action he took because he strongly opposed the parachuting of Shaun Woodward, a defector from the Conservative Party, into the safe Labour seat of St Helens South.

Stoddart was for many years the Chairman of the Campaign for an Independent Britain, which campaigns for the United Kingdom to end its membership of the European Union, a position he held from 1985 until May 2007.

Personal life
Stoddart married Jennifer Percival-Alwyn in 1961, with whom he had two sons. He also had a daughter from a previous marriage.

Death 
Stoddart died on 14 November 2020, at the age of 94, following a short illness.

References

External links 
 
Lord Stoddart of Swindon – Parliament profile

1926 births
2020 deaths
Electrical, Electronic, Telecommunications and Plumbing Union-sponsored MPs
Labour Party (UK) MPs for English constituencies
Life peers
UK MPs 1970–1974
UK MPs 1974
UK MPs 1974–1979
UK MPs 1979–1983
Councillors in Berkshire
Members of the Freedom Association
People educated at St. Clement Danes School
Life peers created by Elizabeth II